Major General Rasika Fernando, RSP, ndc was a Sri Lankan senior army officer. He was the Deputy Chief of Staff of Sri Lankan Army, having served as the, Commander, Security Forces Headquarters – East. He is the Colonel Commandant of the Sri Lanka National Guard.

Military career 
Major General Rasika Fernando enlisted on 6 June 1985 to the Sri Lanka Army, enrolling in the Sri Lanka Military Academy. He was first commissioned as a Second Lieutenant in the Gajaba Regiment. He was the 221 Brigade Commander, Brigadier General Staff (SFHQ-South), Brigadier General Staff (SFHQ-West), Brigadier General Staff (SFHQ-East), Director Infantry of Army Headquarters, General Officer Commanding, 68 Division, Director General General Staff of the OCDS, and the Commander, Security Forces - East. He subsequently was appointed Deputy Chief of Staff and is also the Colonel of the Regiment of the Sri Lanka National Guard.

References 

Living people
Sinhalese military personnel
Sri Lanka Military Academy graduates
Defence Services Command and Staff College graduates
Sri Lankan major generals
Gajaba Regiment officers
Year of birth missing (living people)